Narangi Anchalik Mahavidyalaya is an institution for higher education located at Narengi which is east of the city Guwahati, Assam, a northeastern state of India.

See also
 List of colleges affiliated to Gauhati University

External links
Narangi Official Website
 Gauhati University Official Website

Guwahati
Gauhati University
Educational institutions established in 1991
1991 establishments in Assam
Colleges affiliated to Gauhati University
Universities and colleges in Guwahati